The Culture Lounge is a visual art, philosophy, literary, and culture magazine that emphasizes diversity and expression through the creative forms.

Published in Columbus Nebraska since May 2006, the main focus is raising the awareness of the individual and embracing cultural differences throughout the magazine. They have interviewed musicians such as Two Gallants and visual artists C.Hues who did tour posters for The Grateful Dead.

Utilizing the internet has allowed Culture Lounge to find contributors outside of the United States and each issue boasts the use and recognition of contributors from around the world.

References

Visual arts magazines published in the United States
Bimonthly magazines published in the United States
Magazines established in 2006
Magazines published in Nebraska
Philosophy magazines